This is a list of gliders/sailplanes of the world, (this reference lists all gliders with references, where available) 
Note: Any aircraft can glide for a short time, but gliders are designed to glide for longer.

M

M&D
(M&D Flugzeugbau, Germany)
 M&D Flugzeugbau JS-MD Single
 M&D Flugzeugbau Samburo

Macetti
(A.M. Macetti)
 Macetti Aeronautilo

MacPherson
(Gregg MacPherson)
 MacPherson SG-1

MacPherson
(Gregg MacPherson)
 MacPherson SG-1 Sailplane

Maeda 
(Keniti Maeda)
 Maeda 2 – (前田式2型(光2・1型))
 Maeda 5 – (前田健一 5)
 Maeda 6
 Maeda 7
 Maeda 105 – (前田式105型)
 Maeda 205 – (前田式205型)
 Maeda 703
 Maeda 2600
 Maeda Asahi – (朝日式駒鳥型)
 Maeda-Rokko 1
 Maeda-Rokko 2
 Maeda Ku-1 – a.k.a. Ku-1 Catamaran
 Maeda Ku-6 (Sora-sha – air vehicle, later Kuro-sha – black vehicle)
 Maeda Primary
 Maeda Army Type 2 Small Glider

Maggi
 Maggi MG-3 15L Condor

Magnan
(Dr. A. Magnan)
 Magnan Albatros
 Magnan M-2 Marin
 Magnan Vautour

Magnard
(Vizille Magnard, Isère)
 Magnard glider

MAI 
(Moscow Aviation Institute)
 MAI-03
 MAI-53
 MAI-56
 MAI-60 Snezhinka
 MAI-63
 MAI-68
 MAI-890
 MAI-920
 Oskbes Aviatika Mai 920 – Oskbes MAI Moskau Aviation Institut

Mainelis
(P. Mainelis)
 Mainelis Birzietis (based on (Gö-3 Minimoa)

Malinowski
(Stefan Malinowski)
 Malinowski Dziaba – First Polish Glider Contest August 1923

Maluquer-Gimeno
(Juan J. Maluquer, Wahl & Gimeno)
 Maluquer-Gimeno MG-5 Industrial Engineer
 Maluquer Lenguado

Manicatide
(Radu Manicatide)
 Manicatide RM-10

Mantelli 
(Adriano Mantelli)
 Mantelli AM-1 Me ne frego
 Mantelli AM-6
 Mantelli AM-11 Albatros
 Mantelli AM-12 Argentina
 Mantelli AM-12 Palas
 Mantelli AM-12 Praga
 Mantelli-Fossa MF-1
 Mantelli Parma

Manotskov
(A. Manotskov)
 Manotskov Kachouk (Маноцкова Кашук) (variable dihedral)

Manuel
(William L. Manuel)
 Manuel 1926 Biplane
 Manuel 1929 Biplane
 Manuel VI Primary
 Manuel Crested Wren
 Manuel Willow Wren
 Dunstable Kestrel
 Manuel Hawk
 Manuel Condor
 Manuel Gnat

Marais
(Charles Marais)
 Marais Avionette

Marcho-Silesia 
(T.H. Marcho-Silesia / Akad. Fliegerschaft Marcho-Silesia)
 Marcho-Silesia Oberschlesien
 Marcho-Silesia Seppl

Marianów
(Wladyslaw Gallara / O.O.Marianów Secondary Convent School)
 Marianów W.1
 Marianów W.W.1

Marinavia Farina 
(Domenico Farina / Marinavia Farina SRL)
 Marinavia Farina 15
 Marinavia Farina IV

Markmann
 Markmann Mark-10 (Horten H.Xa/b/c modern materials)

Marsch
(J. C. Marsch)
 Marsch Seaplane

Marsden
(David Marsden)
 Marsden Gemini

Marske Aircraft
(Jim Marske, Marion Ohio, United States)
 Marske XM-1
 Marske Monarch
 Marske Pioneer I
 Marske Pioneer II
 Marske Pioneer III
 Genesis 1 (glider) Jim Marske & John Roncz
 Genesis 2 (motor-glider) Jim Marske & John Roncz

Martens
(A. Martens)
 Martens S
 Martens Pegasus

Martin
(William H. Martin)
 Martin 1908 glider

Masak
(Peter Masak)
 Masak Scimitar

Massia-Biot
(E.D. Massia & Gaston Biot)
 Massia-Biot 1882 glider

Massy
(Max Massy)
 Massy 1922 glider

Matejcek
(Jiri Matejcek / students of the Central Aeronautical Institute, Brno-Medlanky)
 Matejcek M-17 Universal

Matteson
(Fred H. Matteson)
 Matteson M-1

Maupin
(Jim Maupin)
 Maupin Woodstock One
 Maupin Carbon Dragon
 Maupin Windrose

Maxey-Prue
(Irwin Rue, Lyle Maxey – built by Franck Kearns)
 Maxey-Prue Jennie-Mae

Mayer
(Hermann Mayer)
 Mayer M-I
 Mayer MS-II

Mayer
(Oldřich Mayer / Oskar Mayer / Státní průmyslová škola, Moravská Ostrava-Vítkovice / Letov)
 MOV Káně
 Mayerovi Chachar
 Mayer MO-9

McAllister
(Charles McAllister)
 McAllister Yakima Clipper

McDaniel
(Taylor McDaniel)
 McDaniel 1931 Rubber Glider #1
 McDaniel 1931 Rubber Glider #2

McQuilkin
(Robert J. McQuilkin)
 McQuilkin Mach 1

MDM 
(Zaklady Lotnicze Marganski & Myslowski Spolka z o.o. – Margański & Mysłowski Aviation Works)
(MDM – Marganski, Dunowska, Makula)
 Margański & Mysłowski MDM-1 Fox
 Swift S-1

Mead
(T.E. Mead)
 Mead Challenger
 Mead Rhön Ranger

Mehr
(Franz Xaver Mehr)
 Mehr Me-1
 Mehr Me-2
 Mehr Me-3
 Mehr Me-4
 Mehr Me-4a
 Mehr Me-5
 Mehr Me-5a
 Mehr Me-6
 Mehr Me-6a

Meier 
(Michel-Lorenz Meier Hamburger Aero Club)
 Meier Mei-11
 Meier Milomei M-1
 Meier Milomei M-2

Meindl
(Ob.-Ing. Erich Meindl / Burgfalke Flugzeugbau)
 Meindl M-2 Linz

Melsheimer
(Frank Melsheimer)
 Melsheimer FM-1

Merriam
(Capt F. W. Merriam)
 Merriam 1922 glider

Merville 
 Merville SM.20
 Merville SM.30
 Merville SM.31

Messerschmitt 
(Wilhelm Emil Messerschmitt / Messerschmitt AG / Bayerische Flugzeugwerke (BFW))
 Messerschmitt Me 163 Komet
 Messerschmitt Me 321 Gigant
 Messerschmitt S-13
 Messerschmitt S-14
 Messerschmitt S-15
 Messerschmitt S-16
 Messerschmitt S-16B

Meteor
(Meteor C.A., Monfalcone)
 Meteor MS-30 L-Passero

Meusel
Horst Meusel / Verein für Luftfahrt e.V., Zittau)
 Meusel M-IV

Micika
(Milose Micika)
 MiMi B-3 Šídlo

Midland Gliding Club
 Midland Sailplane

Midwest Sailplane
 Midwest MU-1

Miecyslaw Siegel
 Miecyslaw Siegel MS 1
 Miecyslaw Siegel MS 2
 Miecyslaw Siegel MS 3
 Miecyslaw Siegel MS 8

Mignet 
(Henri Mignet)
 Mignet HM-1-1
 Mignet HM-1-2
 Mignet HM-5 Planeur brouette

Mikhaïlovgrad 
 Mikhaïlovgrad Perles – Михайловград Бисер
 Mikhaïlovgrad Moto-Perles – Михайловград Мото-Бисер

Milbert
(Milbert / Hamburger Flugzeugbau (?))
 Milbert Hansa

Miles
(F.G. Miles Ltd.)
 Miles M.76 Durestos Glider Wing

Militi 
 Militi M.B.1
 Militi M.B.2 Leonardo

Miliunas
(Miliunas & Oshkinis / Miliunas & Kontrimas)
 Miliunas-Kontrimas Nida
 Miliunas Oskin MO-1
 Miliunas Oskin MO-2

Miller
(Terry Miller)
 Miller Tern

Mineo
(Michel Minéo)
 Minéo M-5 – Mineo, Michel
 Minéo M-6 – Mineo, Michel

MIP
(Gustaw Mokrzycki, Ludwig Moczarski, Jan Idzkowski & Jerzy Ploszajski / Warsaw Technical High School)
 MIP Smyk

Mišurec-Pučan
(Jindřich Mišurec & Norbert Pučan, Brno)
 Mišurec-Pučan MP-1
 Mišurec-Pučan MP-2

Mitchell
(Don Mitchell (aircraft designer))
 Mitchell Nimbus I
 Mitchell Nimbus II
 Mitchell Nimbus III
 Mitchell B-10
 Mitchell U-2 Super Wing
 Mitchell Victory Wing

MKEK 
(Turkish: Makina ve Kimya Endüstrisi Kurumu - Mechanical and Chemical Industry Corporation)
 MKEK 6

MLL
( )
 MLL Tulák 37

Mlody Lotnik
(Mlody Lotnik - Antoni Uszacki)
 Mlody Lotnik glider

Molino O/Y
See PIK

Möller 
(Flugzeugbau Möller / Ing. Hans Gunther Möller)
 Möller Stormarn

Monaghan
(Richard Monaghan)
 Monaghan Osprey

Monnett
(John T. Monnett)
 Monnett Monerai
 Monnett Monerai S
 Monnett Monerai P
 Monnett Monerai Max
 Monnett Moni

Montagne Noire
 Montagne Noire Pastel MN 600 K

Montgomery
(John Joseph Montgomery)
 Montgomery 1884 glider
 Montgomery 1885 glider
 Montgomery 1886 glider
 Montgomery 1905 The Santa Clara
 Montgomery 1905 The California
 Montgomery 1911 The Evergreen

Mooney
(Walt Mooney)
 Mooney Dust Devil

Moore-Gibson-Emslie
(L.P. Moore, J. Gibson & K. Emslie / The Birmingham Guild Ltd.)
 Moore Gypsy

Moore
(Arien C. Moore)
 Moore SS-1

Morelli
(Alberto & Piero Morelli / Aeromere / CVT / Avionautica Rio / CARMAM)
 Morelli M-100

 Mori 
(Angelo Mori, GVV Tommaso Dal Molin, Varese)
 Mori Anfibio Roma
 Mori Anfibio Varese

Moswey
(Moswey Segelflugzeug-Werke) – (Georg & Heinrich Müller)
 Moswey 1
 Moswey 2
 Moswey 2a
 Moswey 3
 Moswey 4
 Moswey 4a
 Moswey 6
 Moswey GM-1

Motiekaitis
(P. Motiekaitis - Lithuania)
 Motiekaitis Motion-1
 Motiekaitis Motion-2

Mouillard
 Mouillard M-3
 Mouillard M-4

Mroczkowski
(Antoni von Mroczkowski)
 Mroczkowski 1910 Glider

MRsZ
(MRSz - Magyar Repülési Szövetség Központi Műhelye)
 MRSz Bene
 MRSz Z-03 Ifjúság
 MRSz Z-04 Béke
 MRSz A-08 Sirály

Mudry
(Avions Mudry Cie, Port d'attache, Cannes Mandelieu)
 Mudry CAP-1

 MSrE 
(Műegyetemi Sportrepülő Egyesület'' – BME Sportrepülő Association)
 MSrE M-20 (Rubik R-01) – Ernõ RUBIK and Endre JANCSÓ – MSrE
 MSrE M-22 – András Szokolay & Endre Jancso – MSrE / Aero Ever Ltd., Aircraft Factory of Transylvania
 MSrE M-30 Fergeteg
 EMESE-B – Rubik and Jancsó
 EMESE-C – re-designed by Tasnádi

Müller
(K. Müller)
 Müller M-2

Muramaya
 Muramaya Asahi 1

Muraszew & Tomaszewski
 Muraszew & Tomaszewski M.T.1

Musachevo
(Musachevo glider workshop / L. Panov and D. Panchovsky, R. Radomirov, D. Panchovski & Vlychev )
 Kometa Standard
 Kometa-Standard II
 Kometa-Standard III

Musger
(Edwin Musger)
 Musger Mg 1 St. Pölten
 Musger Mg 2
 Musger Mg 4
 Musger Mg 9
 Musger Mg 10
 Musger Mg 12
 Musger Mg 12A
 Musger Mg 15
 Musger Mg 19 Steinadler
 Musger Mg 23
 Musger MG-II Uhu
 Musger Mg-IV Pechvogel
 Musger SG-12

Muszyński
(Zbigniew Muszynski)
 Muszyński ZM-1
 Muszyński ZM-3

Notes

Further reading

External links

Lists of glider aircraft